The  was a Japanese political party that existed in early 1998. It was founded by Diet members that broke away from the New Frontier Party in January 1998. The party has political roots in Minsha kyōkai, and Minsha kyōkai is now the main political factions of the centrist DPP.

The name has its origins in the Taishō period democratic movements, which used the word yūai (fraternity) as a motto. The party also claimed that yūai had a phonetic similarity to the English "you and I", representing their hope of cooperating with ordinary Japanese.

The party was led by Lower House member Kansei Nakano, now a member of the Democratic Party.

Presidents of NFP

See also
Democratic Socialist Party (Japan)

References

1998 disestablishments in Japan
1998 establishments in Japan
Centrist parties in Japan
Defunct political parties in Japan
Defunct social democratic parties
Fraternities
Political parties disestablished in 1998
Political parties established in 1998
Social democratic parties in Japan